Lesbian, gay, bisexual, and transgender (LGBT) rights in Saba are very progressive by Caribbean standards. Saba forms part of the Caribbean Netherlands and is a special municipality of the Netherlands. Both male and female same-sex sexual activity are legal in Saba, with same-sex marriage and adoption being legal since 2012. In addition, discrimination on the basis of "heterosexual and homosexual orientation" is outlawed.

Law regarding same-sex sexual activity
Same-sex sexual activity is legal in Saba.

Recognition of same-sex relationships

Same-sex marriage in Saba became legal following the entry into force of a law enabling same-sex couples to marry on 10 October 2012.

The first same-sex marriage occurred on 4 December 2012 between Xiomar Gonzales Cedeno Ruis and Israel Ruis Gonzales from Aruba and Venezuela, respectively. A second couple from Curaçao married later that month.

Discrimination protections
The Criminal Code BES, which applies to Saba and the islands of Bonaire and Sint Eustatius, criminalizes discrimination on the basis of "heterosexual and homosexual orientation". Article 144 provides for penalties varying from fines to two years' imprisonment.

In addition, Article 1 of the Constitution of the Netherlands applies to Saba. The article reads "All persons in the Netherlands shall be treated equally in equal
circumstances. Discrimination on the grounds of religion, belief, political opinion, race or sex or on any other grounds whatsoever shall not be permitted."

The Netherlands Institute for Human Rights (College voor de Rechten van de Mens) is a research institute which "protects, advances and monitors human rights". The institute, established by law in 2010, works in the European Netherlands and also in the Caribbean Netherlands.

Living conditions
Due to Saba's very small population, there are no gay venues or bars. Nevertheless, many businesses, hotels and restaurants on the island advertise as being "gay-friendly".

Saba is often described as "the gayest island in all the Caribbean". The island is known for its "live and let live" mentality, where discrimination against LGBT people is almost completely unheard of. In 2012, a same-sex couple living in Saba said that the island is perfect "for gay travellers who are not looking for a party atmosphere." There are several gay officials in Saba, including Carl Buncamper, a member of the Saba Island Council, and Glenn Holm, retired director of the Saba Tourism Bureau.

Summary table

See also

LGBT rights in the Netherlands
LGBT rights in the Americas
LGBT rights in Sint Eustatius
LGBT rights in Bonaire
Same-sex marriage in Bonaire, Sint Eustatius and Saba

References